Falling Hare is a 1943 Warner Bros. Merrie Melodies cartoon directed by Bob Clampett. The cartoon features Bugs Bunny.

In this film, Bugs Bunny tries to prevent the wrecking of an American military aircraft by a gremlin. The setting is a base of the United States Army Air Forces. The film's finale explicitly refers to wartime rationing in the United States.

Plot
This cartoon opens with the title credits over the strains of “Down by the Riverside”, then into an extended series of establishing shots of an Army Air Force base, to the brassy strains of “We’re in to Win” (a World War II song also sung by Daffy Duck in Scrap Happy Daffy two months before). The sign at the base reads "U.S. Army Air Field", and below that is shown the location, the number of planes (which include C-45 Expeditors and a Douglas B-18 Bolo) and number of men, all marked "Censored" as a reference to military secrecy. Beneath those categories, a sign reads "What Men Think of Top Sergeant", the reply to which is covered with a large white-on-black "CENSORED!!", implying that the language of the men's reply is not suitable for the public (and would not pass scrutiny by the Hays Office).

Bugs Bunny is seen reclining on a piece of ordnance (a blockbuster bomb) idly reading Victory Thru Hare Power (a spoof of the 1942 book).  He begins laughing uproariously, and turns to the audience to share what he is reading: an assertion that gremlins wreck American planes through diabolical sabotage (he pronounces those words "di-a-bo-lick-al saa-boh-tay-jee), a notion that Bugs finds ludicrous. As he continues enjoying what he considers a hilarious joke, a little yellow humanoid wearing a large blue helmet with airplane wings scuttles by and begins striking the bomb's nose with a mallet, to the tune of "I've Been Working on the Railroad." It takes Bugs a few seconds to realize the reality of the situation, but shortly he asks the gremlin, "What's all the hub-bub, Bub?"

The gremlin explains that the bomb must be hit "just right" in order to be made to explode, and gets back to work. Bugs steps in to suggest that perhaps he ought to "take a whack at it", and proceeds to wind up for a great, hard swing. He stops immediately before making contact, in the sudden realization that, thanks to the strange being, he is engaging in an insane activity. Bugs starts shouting at the creature, but it is apparently gone. Bugs then turns to the audience as he ponders whether he has just had an experience with a gremlin. The gremlin appears on Bugs' face and affirms its existence with a shout, "It ain't Wendell Willkie!" The gremlin, after that, tugs on Bugs' ears and hammers Bugs' foot with a monkey wrench and runs off.

Bugs gives chase and, from its perch on a plane's wing, the gremlin clobbers the rabbit with a monkey wrench, knocking him silly.  Bugs speaks nonsensically as Lennie Small, then as Baby Snooks. When he regains his senses, the now infuriated Bugs gives chase, wielding the monkey wrench and ending up inside a plane (which ironically resembles a Heinkel He-111). The gremlin grabs the wrench and bashes Bugs' foot with it. As Bugs reacts to the pain, the gremlin locks him in, sets the plane in motion and ultimately into the air. Bugs looks for the gremlin, and ends up getting kicked by it - reacting to the creature briefly laughing to the tune of "Yankee Doodle" when it appears at the door's window - is not aware that the plane is aloft until the gremlin opens the door as Bugs comes at it full-throttle, hoping to break it open. The rabbit finds himself in midair and, after turning into a jackass for a moment (as the "You're a horse's ass" motif is heard), he briefly demonstrates a heretofore-unseen ability to fly like a bird before racing through the open sky, back into the plane. Due to strategically placed banana skins, however, he slides out the door on the other side.

The gremlin, believing that his job is done, slams the door triumphantly, but opens it again when he notices it shaking. A terrified Bugs is plastered to it, with his heart pounding "4F" (Army code for drastically limiting medical condition, hospitalization required, and/or ineligible to be inducted via the draft). The gremlin pries him from the door; Bugs flies off but soon settles, curled up and flat, on the bomb bay doors - which, of course, the gremlin opens. Fortunately, Bugs' feet catch on a wire but, as he is hanging there, he sees that the gremlin is now steering the plane into a city and toward two skyscrapers. Bugs rushes into the cockpit, takes control of the airplane, rolls it vertically, and flies through an extremely narrow slot between the towers to avoid what seemed to be an inevitable impact.

The plane goes into a steep nosedive, its wings ripping off during its descent. Bugs is helpless, airsick and melting with terror. The gremlin nonchalantly plays with a yo-yo while awaiting impact. An impossibly short distance above the ground, the plane unexpectedly sputters to a halt and hangs in the air, defying gravity. Both Bugs and the gremlin casually address the audience. The gremlin apologizes for the plane's fuel depletion, while Bugs points to a wartime gas rationing sticker on the plane's windshield and remarks, "Yeah. You know how it is with these A cards!"

Production notes
Falling Hare went into production under the title Bugs Bunny and the Gremlin. Walt Disney was developing a feature based on Roald Dahl’s novel The Gremlins, and asked other animation studios not to produce any films involving gremlins. However, Warner Bros. was too far into production on this cartoon and Russian Rhapsody to remove the references to gremlins, so Leon Schlesinger merely re-titled the cartoons as a compromise.

This is one of the few Bugs Bunny cartoons to have fallen into the public domain, as in 1967, United Artists, the copyright holder for most of the pre-1950s Warner Bros. cartoons at the time, failed to renew the copyright in time.

Release
Because of the cartoon's public domain status, it can be found on budget compilations in lower quality prints, while Warner Home Video issued a restored print on Looney Tunes Golden Collection: Volume 3 and Looney Tunes Platinum Collection: Volume 3, with optional audio commentary by John Kricfalusi and Bill Melendez (Melendez was one of the animators on the cartoon). In 1989, it was included in the MGM/UA Home Video release Bugs & Daffy: The Wartime Cartoons.

When the Southern Television broadcast interruption occurred in the United Kingdom, the interruption ended shortly before the start of this cartoon.

Elements from the short have been used in other Warner Bros. works.
 Footage of this cartoon's climax was incorporated as a flashback into a later Bugs Bunny cartoon, His Hare-Raising Tale (1951). Bugs, narrating to his nephew Clyde, describes himself as a World War II test pilot who narrowly escaped death in a near-crash (fortunately, as in Falling Hare, he ran out of gas). There is no mention of the Gremlin character, and one of Bugs' screams ("Yow-ooo-ooo-ooo-ooo!!") from earlier in the cartoon is inserted into the soundtrack. The scene fades out as it zooms in on the stalled aircraft suspended inches above the ground.
 Black-and-white footage from the cartoon was featured in the second trailer for Gremlins 2: The New Batch (directed by Joe Dante). Though no footage was used in the theatrical cut of the film, a clip from the cartoon appeared in the VHS version.
 The Gremlin nemesis makes two reappearances in Tiny Toon Adventures. In "Journey to the Center of Acme Acres", the Gremlin appears (with several look-alikes) as the cause of earthquakes in Acme Acres after their gold is stolen by Montana Max. Clampett is given an acknowledgement in the credits for their design. In the special Night Ghoulery, a singular Gremlin antagonizes Plucky Duck in the segment titled "Gremlin on a Wing" (a spoof of the Twilight Zone episode "Nightmare at 20,000 Feet").
 It also made a brief cameo in "Plane Pals" (an episode from Animaniacs) as a passenger.
 The scene in which a flattened Bugs mutters "I’m only 3½ years old" and rolls on the floor flat as a pancake is used in "Who Bopped Bugs Bunny?" (an episode from Tiny Toon Adventures).
 The ending "out of gas" gag is referenced in the 2003 theatrical release Looney Tunes Back in Action. Bugs, Daffy, and the live-action characters in the spy car are suspended above the ground until one character comments on the situation's lack of realism, prompting the car to fall the remaining few feet.
 The short was loosely adapted into the 2021 Looney Tunes Cartoons short "High Speed Hare". In this short, Bugs fights the Gremlin while testing a self-driving car, and it shares the ending "out of gas" gag, except the car explodes just when Bugs and the Gremlin break the fourth wall.

Reception
Animator and director David Bowers writes, "Falling Hare is wonderful for many reasons, but the most fun to be had is seeing someone finally get the better of Bugs Bunny... The final big joke is a masterpiece of comic staging. Clampett pours on the suspense as Bugs and the gremlin hurtle toward the earth in a crashing bomber. Falling Hare is filled with great sight gags, but it is also exciting edge-of-your-seat stuff, decades ahead of its time in terms of action staging and cutting."

Home media
Falling Hare is available on Looney Tunes Golden Collection: Volume 3 and Looney Tunes Platinum Collection: Volume 3 and the streaming platform HBO Max.

Voice cast
 Mel Blanc as Bugs Bunny and the Gremlin
 Bob Clampett: vocal effects

In popular culture
The climactic scene in Falling Hare is described in detail in the Douglas Adams novel The Long Dark Tea-Time of the Soul.

See also
 List of films in the public domain in the United States
 The Gremlins
 Gremlin
 Gremlins
 List of Bugs Bunny cartoons

References

External links
 
 

 

1943 films
1943 short films
1943 animated films
1940s animated short films
Films directed by Bob Clampett
Merrie Melodies short films
Films about the United States Army Air Forces
World War II films made in wartime
Vitaphone short films
Animated films about rabbits and hares
Animated films about aviation
American World War II films
World War II aviation films
American aviation films
Films scored by Carl Stalling
Films produced by Leon Schlesinger
Bugs Bunny films
1940s Warner Bros. animated short films
Films about gremlins